Viswanathan–Ramamoorthy were an Indian music composing duo composed of M. S. Viswanathan and T. K. Ramamoorthy. They worked together on over 100 films, from 1952's Panam to 1965's Aayirathil Oruvan. After their split, Ramamoorthy worked on 16 films between 1966 and 1986. He and Viswanathan reunited in 1995 for Engirundho Vandhan.

Early lives

Ramamoorthy 
Ramamoorthy, born into a well-known musical family in Trichy, was a capable violinist at an early age. His father (Krishnasamy Pillai) and grandfather, Malaikottai Govindasamy Pillai, were noted violinists in Trichy. As a child, Ramamoorthy performed several times with his father. During the early 1940s he worked for Saraswathi Stores (in which AVM Productions owner Avichi Meiyappa Chettiar was a partner), and played violin for AVM composer R. Sudharsanam in several films. Ramamoorthy became friendly with P. S. Diwakar, the pianist-composer of Malayalam cinema, and roomed with P. S. Diwakar. C. R. Subburaman hired him as a violinist for HMV. By the late 1940s, Ramamoorthy joined C. R. Subburaman's South Indian film-music ensemble and met fellow violinist T. G. Lingappa.

Viswanathan 
Viswanathan, who had acting and singing ambitions, had a few minor stage roles during the 1940s. The famous music composer in the 1950s T. R. Pappa who was a violinist for the doyen of the Tamil film music S. V. Venkatraman, met him and obtained him a job as an errand boy. Viswanathan developed an interest in composition, and joined S. M. Subbaiah Naidu. He played harmonium for C. R. Subburaman and met Ramamoorthy and T. G. Lingappa, another leading violinist. In addition to the harmonium, Viswanathan began playing piano at an early age.

With Subburaman 
With C. R. Subburaman, Viswanathan played the harmonium and Ramamoorthy the violin. Although both considered Subburaman their mentor, Viswanathan was also inspired by the music of S. V. Venkatraman and T. R. Pappa.

In 1952 Subburaman died unexpectedly, leaving the music for several films unfinished.  Ramamoorthy and Viswanathan completed the background music for Devadas, Chandirani, Marumagal and Kaadhal. Viswanathan then suggested a south-Indian partnership to Ramamoorthy, similar to Shankar Jaikishan in the north. Initially reluctant, Ramamoorthy agreed.

First film 
Their first film was Panam, written by A. L. Seenivasan and directed by N. S. Krishnan (who supported their partnership). Their musical training and personalities differed; the shy Ramamoorthy had a Carnatic musical background and Viswanathan, lacking Carnatic training, was a dynamic individual.

Panam was Sivaji Ganesan's second film and his first appearance with Padmini. Although the duo were initially supposed to be billed as Ramamoorthy-Viswanathan, N. S. Krishnan felt having Viswanathan's name first sounded better and told Ramamoorthy, "You are senior to him so you can be behind him, supporting him" and Ramamoorthy assented.

Composer and singer C. S. Jayaraman commissioned Viswanathan–Ramamoorthy for Ratha Kanneer background music, writing the songs himself.

Success 
Success was slow in coming during a period which featured composers such as G. Ramanathan, S. V. Venkatraman, K. V. Mahadevan, S. Rajeswara Rao, S. Dakshinamurthi and Pendyala Nageswara Rao. In the wake of Panam success, however, Viswanathan–Ramamoorthy wrote music for over 100 films from 1952 to 1965 and were the most successful composers from 1957 to 1965.

They had a flair for light, sweet melodies, and 1950s films such as Porter Kanthan, Paasavalai, Thenali Raman, Gulebakavali, Sugam Enge and Sorgavasal attracted attention. In 1956  Viswanathan–Ramamoorthy composed music for Santhosham, the Telugu adaptation of the Tamil film Velaikaari with N. T. Rama Rao and Anjali Devi, which was a musical hit. It was reprised in Hindi as Naya Aadmi with music by Madan Mohan, who wanted to keep some of the original songs in the Hindi version. The Hindi song "Laut gaya gam ka zamana", sung by Lata Mangeshkar and Hemanta Kumar Mukhopadhyay, copies the duo's Telugu song Teeyani Eenati Reyi (sung by P. Suseela and G. K. Venkatesh) and was a hit in the north.

During the late 1950s, Viswanathan–Ramamoorthy composed for musical hits such as Pudhaiyal, Nichaya Thaamboolam, Padhi Bhakti and Bhaaga Pirivinai. They enjoyed continued success into the early 1960s with directors T. R. Ramanna and A. Bhimsingh. After a 1961 disagreement with his  composer, A. M. Rajah, C. V. Sridhar commissioned Viswanathan–Ramamoorthy for his films and Gemini Studios and AVM Productions later engaged the duo. At this time, they were assisted by R. Govardhanam, G. K. Venkatesh, Shankar–Ganesh and Henry Daniel and used Sathan for vocal and sound effects.

Other collaborations 
Viswanathan and Ramamoorthy, particularly Viswanathan, are credited with moulding the careers of their regular singers T. M. Soundararajan, P. Susheela, P. B. Sreenivas, Seerkazhi Govindarajan and L. R. Eswari. A. L. Raghavan and S. Janaki sang less often for them.

K. J. Yesudas had his only collaboration with the duo in two songs from Kadhalikka Neramillai (1964): "Nenjathai Alli Alli" with L. R. Eswari and P. Suseela and "Enna Paarvai Undhan Paarvai" with P. Suseela. After the partnership dissolved, he sang with Viswanathan and Ramamoorthy separately.

During their early years, they worked with established male singers such as Thiruchi Loganathan, C. S. Jayaraman, S. C. Krishnan, Ghantasala and V. N. Sundharam. The female singers were P. A. Periyanayaki, M. L. Vasanthakumari, R. Balasaraswathi Devi, P. Leela, Jikki, T. V. Rathnam, T. S. Bagavathi, M. S. Rajeswari, K. Jamuna Rani, K. Rani, A. P. Komala and A. G. Rathnamala.

The singing actors N. S. Krishnan, T. A. Madhuram, V. Nagayya, T. R. Mahalingam, K. R. Ramasamy, J. P. Chandrababu, P. Bhanumathi and S. Varalakshmi also sang for the duo. G. K. Venkatesh, M. S. Viswanathan's friend and assistant, sang a few songs as well.

T. M. Soundararajan was Viswanathan's favourite singer and Jikki, followed by P. Susheela, were the duo's primary female singers. They were divided on A. M. Rajah; although Ramamoorthy favoured him, Viswanathan had a personality conflict dating back to Genova. Rajah sang only five Viswanathan–Ramamoorthy songs, at the height of his career during the 1950s. He voiced Gemini Ganesan, the actor for whom he was the primary voice, only in Padhi Bhakti.

P. Leela, Seerkazhi Govindarajan, Sarojini, K. Jamuna Rani, M. S. Rajeswari and A. L. Raghavan owe their 1950s and 1960s vocal success primarily to the duo, particularly to Viswanathan. Directors such as B. R. Panthulu, B. S. Ranga, Krishnan–Panju, A. Bhimsingh, P. Madhavan, C. V. Sridhar, T. R. Ramanna and A. C. Tirulokchandar worked with  Viswanathan–Ramamoorthy frequently until 1965. K. Balachander never worked with the duo, preferring to work with Viswanathan alone even before the split.

Mellisai Mannargal 
On 16 June 1963, Viswanathan and Ramamoorthy were given the title of Mellisai Mannargal (Kings of Light Music) by Sivaji Ganesan at a Madras Triplicane Cultural Academy ceremony sponsored by T. M. Ramachandran, director C. V. Sridhar and Chitralaya Gobu of the Hindu Group of Publications.

Split 
Viswanathan and Ramamoorthy split up after the release of Aayirathil Oruvan on 9 July 1965. They composed for films separately, with the assistants remaining with Viswanathan. Although producer-directors T. R. Ramanna and A. Bhimsingh were saddened by the development, they worked with both men individually.

The split was the result of interpersonal issues. In 1964, C. V. Sridhar directed Kalai Kovil, starring S. V. Subbaiah, R. Muthuraman, Chandrakantha, Nagesh, V. Gopalakrishnan and V. S. Raghavan; Viswanathan and Ramamoorthy produced the film and composed its music. The film and its songs were unsuccessful, and a Kalki article was critical. Disagreement between the composers worsened by Server Sundaram, starring Nagesh, R. Muthuraman and K. R. Vijaya, which was released at the end of 1964. Viswanathan and Ramamoorthy were scheduled to shoot a scene suggested by Bollywood music director Naushad Ali to producer A. V. Meiyappa Chettiar; Ramamoorthy could not appear, and after completing Aayirathil Oruvan the duo announced their split.

In his solo career, Viswanathan composed music for over 700 films from 1965 to 2015. Ramamoorthy was less successful, composing for 19 films from 1966 to 1986. Viswanathan, the highest-paid music director from 1965 to 1985 but faced competition from next generation music composers like Ilayaraja in 1980s and AR Rahman in 1990s but  continued to compose until 1998 in Tamil, Malayalam, Telugu films. After a period he started composing devotional songs. He continued doing live orchestras from 1960s to 2015. He restarted composing songs for albums and films from 2000 until 2015.

Reunion 
Viswanathan and Ramamoorthy briefly reunited in 1995 for the unsuccessful Tamil film Engirundho Vandhan, starring Sathyaraj and Roja. It was the remake of the megahit Malayalam film Chithram. The film was a box office disaster and the songs went unnoticed. It was also their last film together. They received honorary doctorates from Sathyabama University in September 2006.

Thirai Isai Chakravarthy 
Tamil Nadu Chief Minister J.Jayalalithaa gave Viswanathan and Ramamoorthy the title of Thirai Isai Chakravarthy (Emperors of Cine Music) in August 2012.

Deaths 
Ramamoorthy died in a Chennai hospital after a brief illness on 17 April 2013 at age 91.

On 27 June 2015, Viswanathan was admitted to Fortis Malar Hospital in Chennai with respiratory difficulty and died there at 4:15 a.m. on 14 July.

Filmography

References

External links 
 
 
 List of movies composed music by Viswanathan Ramamoorthy

Indian male composers
Indian musical duos
Kannada film score composers
Musicians from Tamil Nadu
Tamil film score composers
Telugu film score composers
Male film score composers